Ximena Lizbeth Esquivel Guzmán (born 22 August 1997) is a Mexican high jumper and former sprinter who competes in international elite competitions. She is a World and Pan American U20 silver medalist and has competed at the 2014 Summer Youth Olympics.

She is originally from Querétaro.

References

External links
 

1997 births
Living people
Mexican female high jumpers
Mexican female sprinters
Athletes (track and field) at the 2014 Summer Youth Olympics
Competitors at the 2018 Central American and Caribbean Games
Central American and Caribbean Games silver medalists for Mexico
Sportspeople from Querétaro
Athletes from Mexico City
Central American and Caribbean Games medalists in athletics
21st-century Mexican women